Alpine Beer Company is an American brewery founded in 1999 by Pat McIlhenney in Alpine, California. Alpine Beer Company produces a variety of beers, many of which have high alcohol content and are strongly hopped beers. The beers have acquired a following due to the popularity of such beers as Pure Hoppiness and Exponential Hoppiness IPAs. Alpine Beer Company was ranked as the fifth best brewery in the US in 2006 by Beer Advocate.

Some Alpine sour beers have been mentioned in the Los Angeles Times as "part of a new wave of refreshing American sour beers".

Alpine has won three Great American Beer Festival medals and eight World Beer Cup medals. In 2003, Alpine won the Bronze in the GABF for its Mandarin Nectar and in 2004 won a silver for McIlhenney’s Irish Red. It was also awarded a gold medal in the 2004 World Beer Cup and a Silver in 2008 for McIlhenney’s Irish Red. In 2016 Alpine was awarded the GABF bronze medal in the Strong Pale Ale category for their HFS IPA.

Prior to founding its own brewery in 2002, Alpine Beer Company had been contracting brewing of its “McIlhenney’s Irish Red”, from AleSmith Brewing Company.

In November 2014, Alpine Beer Company was acquired by fellow San Diego brewery Green Flash Brewing Company.

Beers
 Pure Hoppiness 8% abv
 McIlhenney's Irish Red 6% abv

Photo gallery

See also
 California breweries
 Barrel-aged beer

References

External links
 Official website

Beer brewing companies based in San Diego County, California
Companies based in San Diego County, California